Sa Re Ga Ma Pa The Singing Superstar was the 14th season of the Indian Telugu-language musical/singing reality television show Sa Re Ga Ma Pa. It was premiered on Zee Telugu on 20 February 2022. Shruthika Samudhrala is the winner of the show.

Production 
The show was officially announced in December 2021. In early-February 2022, a teaser trailer of the show was released revealing that Sreemukhi is returning as the presenter after the 12th season. Koti and S. P. Sailaja returned as the judges from the previous season with Smita making her comeback to television after Dance with Me and Ananta Sriram making his debut in the television as judge. Initially M. M. Srilekha was roped in as a judge, which marked her return to the show after a long time. As she is suffered from COVID-19 pandemic, S. P. Sailaja replaced her as one of the judges. D. Satya Sivakumar, Arun Kaundinya and Srikanth Ippili were hired as the voice trainers of the show.

Auditions 
Before conducting on-ground auditions, a digital version of the auditions were held in early-December 2021 soon after the announcement of the show. On-ground auditions of the show were held across ten cities in Andhra Pradesh and Telangana. Khammam auditions were held on 12 December 2021. The next day Visakhapatnam auditions were held at Suryabagh, followed by the Tirupati auditions on 14 December 2021 and Vijayawada auditions on 15 December 2021. Hyderabad auditions were held on 23 December 2021 at Padmalaya Studios.

Judges 

 Koti
 S. P. Sailaja
 Smita
 Ananta Sriram

Mentors 

 Geetha Madhuri
 Sri Krishna
 Saketh Komanduri
 LV Revanth

Guests

Contestants

References 

Zee Telugu original programming
Telugu-language television shows
Indian reality television series
Singing talent shows
Sa Re Ga Ma Pa
2022 Indian television seasons
Zee Bangla contestants